Luigi Mascalaito (born 8 December 1940) is an Italian former professional football player and coach.

As a player, he made 161 appearances in Serie A playing for Internazionale, Pisa and Verona, and a further 222 in Serie B and Serie C with Catanzaro, Cesena, Livorno and Pisa. He then went into management with Verona, and also coached Ancona and Modena.

References

1940 births
Living people
Footballers from Verona
Italian footballers
Association football forwards
Inter Milan players
U.S. Catanzaro 1929 players
A.C. Cesena players
U.S. Livorno 1915 players
Pisa S.C. players
Hellas Verona F.C. players
Serie A players
Serie B players
Serie C players
Italian football managers
Hellas Verona F.C. managers
Alma Juventus Fano 1906 managers
A.C. Ancona managers
Modena F.C. managers